Vaskina Gar is a rural locality (a village) in Leninskoye Rural Settlement, Kudymkarsky District, Perm Krai, Russia. The population was 6 as of 2010.

Geography 
Vaskina Gar is located 31 km south of Kudymkar (the district's administrative centre) by road. Pronina is the nearest rural locality.

References 

Rural localities in Kudymkarsky District